The Peters River is a river in the U.S. states of Massachusetts and Rhode Island.  It flows .

Course
The river rises from Curtis Pond in Bellingham, Massachusetts, flowing south through Bellingham and into Woonsocket, Rhode Island where is flows into the Blackstone River.

Crossings
Below is a list of all crossings over the Peters River. The list starts at the headwaters and goes downstream.
Bellingham
Maple Brook Road
Cross Street
Railroad Street
Pulaski Boulevard
Wrentham Road
Paine Street
Woonsocket
Diamond Hill Road (RI 114)
Wood Avenue
Mill Street

Tributaries
Arnolds and Bungay Brooks are the only two named tributaries of the Peters River, though it has many unnamed streams that also feed it.

See also
List of rivers in Massachusetts
List of rivers in Rhode Island
Blackstone River

References

Rivers of Worcester County, Massachusetts
Rivers of Providence County, Rhode Island
Rivers of Massachusetts
Rivers of Rhode Island
Tributaries of Providence River